Guyaleh (also Romanized as Gūyaleh; also known as Gavāleh Kalāsh, Gavīleh, Govaleh, Kavīleh, and Kovīleh) is a village in Kalashi Rural District, Kalashi District, Javanrud County, Kermanshah Province, Iran. At the 2006 census, its population was 139, in 27 families.

References 

Populated places in Javanrud County